Tunja Airport  is a high-elevation airport serving Tunja, the capital of Boyacá Department in Colombia. The airport and city lay between two large north–south ridges, with the airport on a slight rise east of the city, .

See also

Transport in Colombia
List of airports in Colombia

References

External links
OpenStreetMap - Tunja
OurAirports - Tunja
SkyVector - Tunja
Tunja Airport

Airports in Colombia